Daṇḍaka was an ancient Indo-Aryan tribe of south-central  South Asia whose existence is attested during the Iron Age.

Location
The capital of Daṇḍaka was named Kumbhavatī, or Madhumanta, or Govardhana, and corresponds to  the modern-day Nāśik.

History
The Daṇḍakas and their ruling clan, the Bhojas, were descended from the Ṛgvedic Yadu tribe.

References

Further reading

Ancient peoples of India